| top goal scorer     =  Valentín Castellanos Hany Mukhtar(3 goals each)
| prevseason          = 2020
| nextseason          = 2022
}}

The 2021 MLS Cup Playoffs (branded as the 2021 Audi MLS Cup Playoffs for sponsorship reasons) was the 26th edition of the MLS Cup Playoffs, the post-season championship of Major League Soccer (MLS), the top soccer league in the United States and Canada. The tournament culminated the 2021 MLS regular season. The tournament began on November 20 and concluded with MLS Cup 2021 on December 11.

The Columbus Crew were the defending MLS Cup champions, but failed to qualify for the playoffs after finishing ninth in the Eastern Conference.

The 2021 MLS Cup Playoffs marked the first time since 2004 that no club from Texas qualified, and the first time ever that no club from California qualified.

Qualified teams

Eastern Conference
Atlanta United FC
Nashville SC
New England Revolution
New York City FC
New York Red Bulls
Orlando City SC
Philadelphia Union

Western Conference
Colorado Rapids
Minnesota United FC
Portland Timbers
Real Salt Lake
Seattle Sounders FC
Sporting Kansas City
Vancouver Whitecaps FC

Conference standings
The top seven teams in the Eastern and Western Conference qualify for the MLS Cup Playoffs, with the conference champions receiving second round byes. Background colors denote playoff teams, with green also qualifying for the 2022 CONCACAF Champions League.

Eastern Conference

Western Conference

Bracket

Note: The higher seeded teams hosted matches, with the MLS Cup host determined by overall points.

First round
The second through fourth seeded teams in each conference hosted the first round matches. The top seeds in each conference got a bye to the Conference Semifinals.

Eastern Conference

Western Conference

Conference Semifinals
The higher-seeded teams in each match-up hosted the matches.

Eastern Conference

Western Conference

Conference Finals
The higher-seeded teams in each conference hosted the matches.

Eastern Conference

Western Conference

MLS Cup 2021

The highest-ranked team remaining in the overall table (Portland Timbers) hosted the match.

Top goalscorers

References

2021 Major League Soccer season
MLS Cup Playoffs
MLS Cup Playoffs
MLS Cup Playoffs